Thomas Swiss is an American poet and writer.  He was Professor of English and Rhetoric of Inquiry at the University of Iowa, before teaching as professor of Culture and Teaching at the University of Minnesota.

Life
Swiss grew up in the suburbs of Chicago, mostly in Aurora, Illinois, where his father had an optometric practice. He graduated from the University of Illinois-Urbana, moved to Nottingham, England and returned to Illinois to work for the National Council of Teachers of English.  In 1976, Swiss went to the Writers' Workshop at the University of Iowa and earned an M.F.A. in creative writing,  He taught at Drake University in Iowa, was awarded a National Endowment for the Arts Fellowship and published his first book of poems, Measure, with the University of Alabama Press.  Swiss' second book, Rough Cut, was published by the University of Illinois Press.

Swiss' poems have appeared in many periodicals, including The American Scholar, Boston Review, AGNI, and the Iowa Review. His collaborative new media poems and literary projects have been exhibited in museums and shows, including shows at the School of Visual Arts, New York; The British Academy, UK; Transmediale.02 Festival, Berlin, Germany; and the South By Southwest New Media Festival, Austin TX.

Swiss' critical articles have appeared in the Review of Education, Pedagogy, and Cultural Studies, Popular Music, Postmodern Culture, Current Musicology, and The New England Review. His book reviews have been published in The New York Times Book Review, Contemporary Visual Arts, and other magazines.

Swiss has authored critical articles and book chapters, and edited or co-edited nine books including New Media Poetics: Contexts, Technotexts, and Theories (MIT Press, co-edited with Adalaide Morris), a collection meant to extend understanding of networked writing and programming as a medium for an emergent poetics. In Highway 61 Revisited: Bob Dylan's Road from Minnesota to the World (U Minnesota Press, co-edited with Colleen Sheehy), Bob Dylan's work is explored in both local and global perspectives.  Other books include The World Wide Web and Contemporary Cultural Theory : Magic, Metaphor, Power (Routledge, co-edited with Andrew Herman) and a collaborative collection (Routledge, co-edited with Andrew Herman and Jan Hadlaw) on the topic of the imaginaries and materialities of the mobile Internet.

Selected publications
 Anson, C., Beach, R., Breuch, L., & Swiss, T. (2009). Teaching Writing Using Blogs, Wikis, and other Digital Tools. Norwood, Massachusetts: Christopher-Gordon.
Swiss, T. (Ed.). (2001). Unspun: Key concepts for understanding the World Wide Web. New York: New York University Press.
Swiss, T., & Herman, A. (Eds.). (2000). The World Wide Web and contemporary cultural theory: Magic, metaphor, power. Oxford: Routledge.
Swiss, T. (1997). Rough Cut: Poems. Urbana, Illinois: University of Illinois Press.
Swiss, T. New media collaborative poems, Revised November 2009

Criticism
 "I Have Made This Song": Hayden Carruth's Poetry and Criticism,, The Sewanee Review, Vol. XCIII, No. 1, Winter, 1985, pp. 149–57
 A REVIEW OF: "www.claptrap.com", electronicbookreview, March 15, 1998, page 43
 The World Wide Web and Contemporary Cultural Theory, Andrew Herman, Thomas Swiss, Routledge, 2000 
 Let It Blurt: The Life and Times of Lester Bangs, America's Greatest Rock Critic Jim Derogatis (broadway Books, 2000)'', popmatters
 Artists and Innovators - Literature in a Hypermedia Mode: An interview with Marjorie Luesebrink, popmatters.com

Non-Fiction
 Swiss, T., and Horner, B. (Eds.), (2000). Key Terms in Popular Music and Culture, Boston, Massachusetts: Blackwell. 
 Morris, A., & Swiss, T. (Eds.). (2009). New Media Poetics, Cambridge: The MIT Press. June 2006, 
 Sheehy, C., & Swiss, T. (2009). Highway 61 Revisited: Bob Dylan’s Road from Minnesota to the World, Minneapolis: University of Minnesota Press.

References

External references
 T h o m a s + S w i s s
 Thomas Swiss page, University of Minnesota
 Books by Thomas Swiss

Iowa Writers' Workshop faculty
Living people
University of Minnesota faculty
American academics of English literature
Year of birth missing (living people)